The 1949 Philadelphia Athletics season involved the A's finishing fifth in the American League with a record of 81 wins and 73 losses.

Offseason 
 November 10, 1948: Tod Davis was drafted by the Athletics from the Chicago White Sox in the 1948 rule 5 draft.
 December 16, 1948: Bob Savage was selected off waivers from the Athletics by the St. Louis Browns.
 Prior to 1949 season: Skeeter Kell was signed as an amateur free agent by the Athletics.

Regular season 
The 1949 Philadelphia Athletics team set a major league team record of executing 217 double plays, a record which still presently stands.

Season standings

Record vs. opponents

Notable transactions 
 September 28, 1949: Bill McCahan and $25,000 were traded by the Athletics to the Brooklyn Dodgers for Kermit Wahl.

Roster

Player stats

Batting

Starters by position 
Note: Pos = Position; G = Games played; AB = At bats; H = Hits; Avg. = Batting average; HR = Home runs; RBI = Runs batted in

Other batters 
Note: G = Games played; AB = At bats; H = Hits; Avg. = Batting average; HR = Home runs; RBI = Runs batted in

Pitching

Starting pitchers 
Note: G = Games pitched; IP = Innings pitched; W = Wins; L = Losses; ERA = Earned run average; SO = Strikeouts

Other pitchers 
Note: G = Games pitched; IP = Innings pitched; W = Wins; L = Losses; ERA = Earned run average; SO = Strikeouts

Relief pitchers 
Note: G = Games pitched; W = Wins; L = Losses; SV = Saves; ERA = Earned run average; SO = Strikeouts

Farm system 

 LEAGUE CHAMPIONS: Kewanee, Red Springs

References

External links
1949 Philadelphia Athletics team at Baseball-Reference
1949 Philadelphia Athletics team page at baseball-almanac.com

Oakland Athletics seasons
Philadelphia Athletics season
Oak